Addlestone railway station serves the town of Addlestone in the Runnymede District of Surrey, England. It is located on the Chertsey Branch Line and is operated by South Western Railway.

The station was opened, with the branch line, on 14 February 1848. It comprises Up and Down platforms having brick buildings: the main building being on the Down side. There is a level crossing with Station Road (B3121) on the south side of the station. Just under a mile south of the station, the line crosses the River Wey. After leaving the station southbound trains approach Addlestone Junction and can either head westward towards Byfleet and New Haw (and subsequent stations on the South West Main Line) or head eastward to terminate at Weybridge.

History
Opened by the London and South Western Railway, it became part of the Southern Railway during the Grouping of 1923. The line then passed on to the Southern Region of British Railways on nationalisation in 1948.

When Sectorisation was introduced, the station was served by Network SouthEast until the Privatisation of British Railways.

Services
There is a direct half-hourly service at non-peak times from the station to Waterloo via Staines and Hounslow, although it is normally quicker to change at Virginia Water for a faster service.  An alternative route to Waterloo is to change at Weybridge (Mondays to Saturdays) or Byfleet & New Haw (Sundays and early mornings/late evenings only) on the South West Main Line.

Connections
Bus routes 431 and 461, both operated on behalf of Surrey County Council, stop outside the station.

References

External links

 Station on navigable O.S. map
 More information and photographs of station

Railway stations in Surrey
DfT Category E stations
Former London and South Western Railway stations
Railway stations in Great Britain opened in 1848
Railway stations served by South Western Railway